Marty Balin Greatest Hits is Marty Balin's 1999 album.  The first half of the album contains all-new recordings of songs that Marty had previously performed with Jefferson Airplane, Jefferson Starship, KBC Band, and during his solo career.  The second half of the album contains interviews with Balin about various subjects.

Track listing
"When Love Comes" (Gene Heart, David Evan) – 4:05
"Miracles" (Marty Balin) – 6:56
"Atlanta Lady" (Jesse Barish) – 3:21
"Plastic Fantastic Lover" (Balin) – 3:44
"Until You" (Richard Landers) – 3:51
"Count on Me" (Barish) – 3:15
"Today" (Balin, Paul Kantner) – 3:03
"My Heart Picked You" (Landers) – 2:49
"Hearts" (Barish) – 4:17
"What Love Is" (Greg Prestopino, Brock Walsh) – 4:16
"Runaway" (Nicholas Q. Dewey) – 3:55
"Beautiful Girl" (Gale Landers, Landers) – 2:55
"Summer of Love" (Balin) – 3:47
"With Your Love" (Balin, Joey Covington, Vic Smith) – 3:35
"Comin' Back to Me" (Balin) – 5:05
"Volunteers" (Balin, Kantner) – 3:27
Interviews
Jefferson Airplane - The Beginning
Janis Joplin - The Queen
Jim Morrison - The Poet
Jerry Garcia - The Deadhead
Jimi Hendrix - The Experience
Paul McCartney - The Pinnacle

Personnel
Marty Balin - vocals
Slick Aguilar - guitar
Vern Vennard - guitar
Brian Barrele - keyboards
Dave Burns - trumpet
Al Caldwell - bass
Richard Bassil - bass
Kimmy Carter - bass
Don Drewitt - drums
Shannon Forest - drums
Mark Huth - saxophone
Dirk Johnson - keyboards
Bill Lawton - guitar
Mark Maher - keyboards
Phil Minardi - sequencing, keyboards
Andy O'Conner - drums
Pete Ruthenburg - keyboards
Michael Severs - guitar
Spud Taylor - guitar
Zak Perry - guitar
Patti Flannigan, Nannette Britt, Summer Pen'et, Liz Lawton, Kelli Bruce, Vickie Carrico – background vocals

References

1999 albums
Marty Balin albums
Covers albums
Interview albums